The 1990 Mecklenburg-Vorpommern state election was held on 14 October 1990 to elect the members of the first Landtag of Mecklenburg-Vorpommern. It was the first election held in Mecklenburg-Vorpommern since the reunification of Germany, which took place on 3 October. The Christian Democratic Union (CDU) led by Alfred Gomolka emerged as the largest party with 38.3% of the vote, followed by the Social Democratic Party (SPD) with 27.0%. The CDU subsequently formed a coalition with the Free Democratic Party (FDP), and Gomolka became Mecklenburg-Vorpommern's first post-reunification Minister-President.

Parties
The table below lists parties which won seats in the election.

Election result

|-
! colspan="2" | Party
! Votes
! %
! Seats 
! Seats %
|-
| bgcolor=| 
| align=left | Christian Democratic Union (CDU)
| align=right| 343,447
| align=right| 38.3
| align=right| 29
| align=right| 43.9
|-
| bgcolor=| 
| align=left | Social Democratic Party (SPD)
| align=right| 242,147
| align=right| 27.0
| align=right| 21
| align=right| 31.8
|-
| bgcolor=| 
| align=left | Party of Democratic Socialism (PDS)
| align=right| 140,397
| align=right| 15.7
| align=right| 12
| align=right| 18.2
|-
| bgcolor=| 
| align=left | Free Democratic Party (FDP)
| align=right| 49,104
| align=right| 5.5
| align=right| 4
| align=right| 6.1
|-
! colspan=8|
|-
| bgcolor=| 
| align=left | The Greens (Grüne)
| align=right| 37,336
| align=right| 4.2
| align=right| 0
| align=right| 0
|-
| bgcolor=| 
| align=left | New Forum (NF)
| align=right| 26,230
| align=right| 2.9
| align=right| 0
| align=right| 0
|-
| bgcolor=| 
| align=left | Alliance 90 (B90)
| align=right| 19,948
| align=right| 2.2
| align=right| 0
| align=right| 0
|-
| bgcolor=| 
| align=left | Christian Social Union (CSU)
| align=right| 9,975
| align=right| 1.1
| align=right| 0
| align=right| 0
|-
| bgcolor=|
| align=left | Others
| align=right| 27,415
| align=right| 3.1
| align=right| 0
| align=right| 0
|-
! align=right colspan=2| Total
! align=right| 895,999
! align=right| 100.0
! align=right| 66
! align=right| 
|-
! align=right colspan=2| Voter turnout
! align=right| 
! align=right| 64.7
! align=right| 
! align=right| 
|}

Sources
 Landtagswahlen Mecklenburg-Vorpommern

1990 elections in Germany
1990
1990s in Mecklenburg-Western Pomerania